Mark John Ovendale (22 November 1973 – 29 August 2011) was an English football goalkeeper.

Playing career
Ovendale was born in Leicester and began his career with local village team Leverington before joining Wisbech Town. He moved to Northampton Town, playing six league games in the 1994–95 season. He joined Welsh champions Barry Town in August 1997 and after a successful first season, joined AFC Bournemouth for a fee of £30,000 in July 1998.

He quickly became the first choice in the Bournemouth goal, making his Cherries' debut on the opening day of the 1998–99 season, a 2–0 win at home to  Lincoln City. He remained a regular over the next two seasons before a £425,000 move took him to Luton Town in August 2000.

Luton manager Ricky Hill installed Ovendale as his first choice goalkeeper, but he struggled to make an impact and spent the season in and out of the side, with former first choice Nathan Abbey replacing him on a number of occasions. With Abbey released and Luton relegated at the end of the season, Ovendale found himself as second choice goalkeeper, following the signing of Carl Emberson.

He appeared only sporadically over the next two seasons and was released in 2003. In late July that year he re-signed for Barry Town, but just two weeks later joined York City. York were relegated to the Conference at the end of the season, and Ovendale was one of a number of players released.

He signed for non-league Tiverton Town in the summer of 2004, where he remained until May 2006 when he joined Welsh side Carmarthen Town. He played for Carmarthen in the Inter-Toto Cup against Finnish side Tampere United, but left in July 2006 to join Newport County, signing as a replacement for the injured Tony Pennock. He was forced to retire from playing in June 2007 due to a hip injury.

Coaching career
Mark joined Wimborne Town in a coaching role in August 2008 but made a few appearances in goal for the club during the 2008–09 season.

Death
He died in August 2011 from cancer. Days after Ovendale's death, his old club Barry Town honoured him into the Barry Town Hall of Fame and a memorial match was held at the Newport Stadium.

References

External links

1973 births
2011 deaths
Footballers from Leicester
English footballers
Northampton Town F.C. players
AFC Bournemouth players
Luton Town F.C. players
Tiverton Town F.C. players
York City F.C. players
Carmarthen Town A.F.C. players
Newport County A.F.C. players
English Football League players
Cymru Premier players
Barry Town United F.C. players
Association football goalkeepers
Wimborne Town F.C. players
Wisbech Town F.C. players